Indian Village is a neighborhood located in Detroit, Michigan, bounded to the north and south by Mack Avenue and East Jefferson Avenue, respectively, along the streets of Burns, Iroquois, and Seminole. The district was listed on the National Register of Historic Places in 1972.

Overview
The district has a number of architecturally-significant homes built in the early 20th century. Some of the houses have been substantially restored, and many others are well kept up. Bordering Indian Village to the west is West Village, with additional historic homes, townhouses and apartments.

Many of the homes were designed by prominent architects, such as Albert Kahn, Louis Kamper and William B. Stratton, for some of the area's most prominent citizens, such as Edsel Ford. A lot of homes are very large, with some over 12,000 square feet (1,100 m²). Many have a carriage house, with some of those being larger than an average suburban home. Some of the houses also have large amounts of Pewabic Pottery tiles.

Indian Village has very active community organizations, including the Indian Village Association, Men's Garden Club and Women's Garden Club. The neighborhood hosts an annual Home & Garden Tour on the first Saturday in June, neighborhood yard sales in September, a holiday home tour in December, and many other community events. The neighborhood contains many historic homes including that of automotive entrepreneur Henry Leland, founder of Lincoln and Cadillac, who resided at 1052 Seminole St. With a white population of 63 percent Indian Village is one of Detroit's few white majority neighborhoods.

Schools
Detroit Public Schools operates the area's public schools.

Residents are zoned to Nichols Elementary School, Marcus Garvey African Centered Academy K-8 for middle school, and Southeastern High School. On previous occasions, Butzel Middle School served Indian Village.

Private schools serving Indian Village include the Benjamin E. Mays Male Academy, the Detroit Waldorf School and Detroit Friends School. Cornerstone Schools formerly operated the K-5 Iroquois Campus in Indian Village.

Notable buildings

See also

East Jefferson Avenue Residential TR
Neighborhoods in Detroit
Manoogian Mansion (the official residence of the mayor of Detroit, it is located near Indian Village; the home was given to the city in 1966)

References

Further reading

External links

Indian Village homepage

Neighborhoods in Detroit
Culture of Detroit
National Register of Historic Places in Detroit
Historic districts on the National Register of Historic Places in Michigan